Burak Hasan (born 4 July 1985 in Melbourne, Victoria) is an Australian taekwondo practitioner. Hasan qualified for the men's 68 kg class at the 2008 Summer Olympics in Beijing, after placing third from the World Qualification Tournament in Manchester, England. He lost the preliminary round of sixteen match to Peru's Peter López, with a score of 1–3.

References

External links
Profile – Australian Olympic Team

NBC Olympics Profile

Australian male taekwondo practitioners
1985 births
Living people
Olympic taekwondo practitioners of Australia
Taekwondo practitioners at the 2008 Summer Olympics
Sportspeople from Melbourne
21st-century Australian people